"Save Room" is a song by American recording artist John Legend, taken from his second album, Once Again (2006). A joyful love song, it was written by Legend along with will.i.am and Jessyca Wilson, and built along a sample of Gábor Szabó's version of the Classics IV hit "Stormy”, written by Buddy Buie and James B. Cobb, Jr.  Legend used the sample at the suggestion of frequent collaborator Kanye West. Production was helmed by both Legend and will.i.am. A music video was made for the song, directed by Bryan Barber.

Released as the album's first single, "Save Room" became a top 10 hit in Italy and the Netherlands while reaching the top 20 in the Flemish region of Belgium and on Billboards US Hot R&B/Hip-Hop Songs chart. In the United Kingdom, the single received a digital only release and chart rules at that time prevented it from charting. A critical success, the song was also nominated for the Grammy Award for Best Male Pop Vocal Performance.

Track listings

Notes
 signifies an additional producer

Personnel
Credits adapted from the liner notes of Once Again.

 Produced by will.i.am and John Legend
 Recorded by will.i.am and Padraic Kerin at Spiral Recording, LA, Anthony Kilhoffer (assisted by Gelly Kusuma) at The Record Plant, LA and Anthony "Rocky" Gallo at The Cutting Room
 Vocals: John Legend
 Mixed by Tony Maserati at Chung King Studios
 Guitar: Sharief Hobley
 Live Drums: will.i.am and Swiss Chris
 Horns: Corey Hogan, Ryck Jane (Jenee Dixon) and Karesha Crawford
 Additional Keyboards: John Legend
 Background Vocals: Jessyca Wilson and Sasha Allen

Charts

Weekly charts

Year-end charts

Certifications

References

External links
 

2006 singles
John Legend songs
Music videos directed by Bryan Barber
Contemporary R&B ballads
Songs written by John Legend
Songs written by will.i.am
Song recordings produced by will.i.am
GOOD Music singles
Songs written by Buddy Buie
Songs written by J. R. Cobb
2006 songs